Familial thoracic aortic aneurysm is an autosomal dominant disorder of large arteries.

There is an association between familial thoracic aortic aneurysm and Marfan syndrome as well as other hereditary connective tissue disorders.

Signs and symptoms
A degenerative breakdown of collagen, elastin, and smooth muscle caused by aging contributes to weakening of the wall of the artery.

In the aorta, this can result in the formation of a fusiform aneurysm. There is also increased risk of aortic dissection.

Genetics
Types include:

Diagnosis

Treatment

Terminology
It is sometimes called "Erdheim cystic medial necrosis of aorta", after Jakob Erdheim.

The term "cystic medial degeneration" is sometimes used instead of "cystic medial necrosis", because necrosis is not always found.

References

External links 

  GeneReview/NCBI/NIH/UW entry on Thoracic Aortic Aneurysms and Aortic Dissections

Diseases of the aorta
Genetic disorders by system